Clayton County is the name of two counties in the United States:

 Clayton County, Georgia in the Atlanta Metropolitan Area
 Clayton County, Iowa

It was also the former name of Clay County, Arkansas.